Thomas Gilligan (born 3 November 1978) is an Australian rules footballer who played for Adelaide Football Club in the Australian Football League.

Gilligan played as a young ruckman in 1997 for the Crows, being treated to a baptism of fire in his three games. He would remain a backup to lead ruckman Shaun Rehn. Gilligan did not play any AFL games in 1998 for the Crows and was delisted.

Gilligan played for St Mary's Football Club in the Geelong Football League, winning premierships in 2004 and 2008. He was named at 33 in the top 50 Geelong Football League players of all time.

References

Adelaide Football Club players
Port Adelaide Magpies players
1978 births
Living people
Dandenong Stingrays players
Frankston Bombers players
Australian rules footballers from Victoria (Australia)